Cumming v. Richmond County Board of Education, 175 U.S. 528 (1899), ("Richmond") was a class action suit decided by the Supreme Court of the United States. It is a landmark case, in that it sanctioned de jure segregation of races in American schools. The decision was overruled by Brown v. Board of Education (1954).

About the case
The plaintiffs, "Cumming, Harper and Ladeveze, citizens of Georgia and persons of color suing on behalf of themselves and all others in like case joining with them," originally filed suit by petition against the Board of Education of Richmond County (the "Board") and one "Charles S. Bohler, tax collector" in the Superior Court of Richmond County, claiming, among other causes of action, that a $45,000 tax levied against the county for primary, intermediate, grammar, and high schools was illegal insofar as the high schools of the county were exclusively for white students and seeking an injunction barring the collection of so much of the total amount as was earmarked for the white only high school system.

County was reversed upon the ground that it erred in granting an injunction against the Board of Education. In accordance with that decision, the Superior Court upon the return of the cause from the Supreme Court of the State, refused the relief asked by the plaintiffs, and dismissed their petition. Thereafter, the plaintiffs appealed that order to the US Supreme Court as being in derogation of their rights under the US Constitution.

Decision
The Supreme Court affirmed on economic arguments, among others. It claimed that there are many more colored children than white children in the area and that the Board could not afford to supply everyone with education. The court reasoned that there was a choice between educating 60 white children and educating no one.

The Supreme Court denied that it had any jurisdiction to interfere in the decisions of the state courts. The decision states in pertinent part:

The final remark says:

Justice John Marshall Harlan, who was the lone dissenter in Plessy v. Ferguson, wrote the opinion for a unanimous court.

See also
 List of United States Supreme Court cases, volume 175

References

Sources

External links

United States Supreme Court cases
United States Supreme Court cases of the Fuller Court
School segregation in the United States
United States equal protection case law
United States school desegregation case law
1899 in United States case law
History of Augusta, Georgia
1899 in education
1899 in Georgia (U.S. state)
Legal history of Georgia (U.S. state)
Education in Richmond County, Georgia
African-American history between emancipation and the civil rights movement
Civil rights movement case law
African-American history of Georgia (U.S. state)